A Little Bit of This, a Little Bit of That is the only studio album by dance act D Mob. It was released on ffrr Records in 1989. The album peaked at No. 46 on the UK Albums Chart, No. 72 in Australia, and No. 82 on the Billboard 200 in the US.

Cathy Dennis sings vocals for two songs, one of which, "C'mon and Get My Love," became a top 10 hit in the United States, peaking at number 10, and reaching number 15 in the UK.

Critical reception
AllMusic wrote: "Those who consider house music one-dimensional must give a serious listen to D-Mob's unpredictable and appropriately titled A Little Bit of This, A Little Bit of That."

Track listing
UK CD
 "C'mon and Get My Love" [featuring Cathy Dennis] 3:51
 "All I Do" [featuring Danny Madden] 5:56
 "It Really Don't Matter" [featuring Dancin' Danny D] 4:19	
 "That's the Way of the World" [featuring Cathy Dennis] 4:03
 "It Really Don't Matter (Reprise)" 2:49
 "It Is Time to Get Funky" [featuring LRS and DC Sarome] 3:31	
 "Put Your Hands Together" [featuring Nuff Juice] 4:09
 "A Rhythm from Within" 4:41	
 "Trance Dance" [featuring Gary Haisman] 4:13	
 "We Call It Acieed" [featuring Gary Haisman] 3:51	
 "C'mon and Get My Love" (Spaghetti Western Mix) 	7:51
 "It Is Time to Get Funky" (The Casualty Mix) 8:10

References

1989 debut albums
D Mob albums